Monahans High School is a public high school located in Monahans, Texas, United States and classified as a 4A school by the University Interscholastic League (UIL). It is part of the Monahans-Wickett-Pyote Independent School District located in northeast Ward County.  In 2017, the school was rated "Met Standard" by the Texas Education Agency.

Athletics
The Monahans Loboes compete in these sports - 

Cross Country, Volleyball, Football, Basketball, Powerlifting, Swimming, Golf, Tennis, Track, Softball & Baseball

State Titles
Football - 
1948(1A)
Boys Golf - 
1970(2A), 1971(2A), 2018(4A), 2019(4A)
Girls Golf - 
2009(3A), 2010(3A)
Boys Track - 
1966(3A), 1973(3A)
Volleyball - 
1969(3A), 1970(3A). 1974(3A), 1975(3A)^, 1975(3A)", 1979(3A), 1982(4A), 1984(4A), 2004(3A)

^ Spring

" Fall

State Finalist
Volleyball - 
2003(3A), 2005(3A). 2007(3A), 2009(3A)

Notable alumni

Carter Casteel (Class of 1961) - former member of the Texas House of Representatives from Comal County
Deanna Dunagan (Class of 1958) - Tony Award-winning actress
Wayne Hansen - former NFL player
Natalie Zea - television actress

References

External links
 Monahans-Wickett-Pyote Independent School District

Schools in Ward County, Texas
Public high schools in Texas